Astley David Middleton Cooper (December 23, 1856 – September 10, 1924) was an American painter of Western and Indigenous themes, as well as portraiture, and nude studies of women.

He is also attributed to having a bohemian lifestyle, which his art paid for. Cooper was opposed to the American Indian Wars, and earned Indigenous peoples' respect while living with them in the West. The artist's style seems to be derivative from Julian Rix and other landscape painters, while Cooper himself never explicitly said so.

References 

19th-century American painters

1856 births
1924 deaths
People from San Jose, California
People from St. Louis
20th-century American painters
Sam Fox School of Design & Visual Arts alumni